Cavernous venous malformations present as rounded, bright red or deep purple, spongy nodules, occurring chiefly on the head and neck and may involve both the skin and the mucous membranes.

It can be associated with KRIT1, CCM2 or PDCD10.

See also 
 Skin lesion
 List of cutaneous conditions

References

External links 

Cutaneous congenital anomalies